Saphenista rufoscripta is a species of moth of the family Tortricidae. It is found in Peru.

The wingspan is about 22.5 mm. The ground colour of the forewings is yellowish cream with an indistinct rust hue except for the apical area. The base of the costa and dorsum are suffused brown. The hindwings are cream.

Etymology
The species name refers to the colouration of the forewings and is derived from Latin rufa
(meaning rusty) and scripta (meaning written).

References

Moths described in 2010
Saphenista